Shakhban Kurbanovich Gaydarov (born 21 January 1997) is a Russian football player. He plays for PFC Dynamo Stavropol.

Club career
He made his debut in the Russian Professional Football League for FC Anzhi-2 Makhachkala on 19 July 2017 in a game against FC Chernomorets Novorossiysk.

He made his Russian Premier League debut for FC Anzhi Makhachkala on 10 March 2019 in a game against FC Lokomotiv Moscow.

References

External links
 Profile by Russian Professional Football League

1997 births
People from Tlyaratinsky District
Living people
Russian footballers
FC Anzhi Makhachkala players
FC Dynamo Stavropol players
Association football midfielders
Russian Premier League players
Sportspeople from Dagestan
20th-century Russian people
21st-century Russian people